Pruvotina is a genus of cavibelonian solenogasters, shell-less, worm-like marine mollusks in the subfamily Pruvotininae of the family Pruvotinidae.

Species
 Pruvotina artabra Zamarro, Garcia-Alvarez & Urgorri, 2013
 Pruvotina bathyalis Pedrouzo, García-Álvarez & Urgorri, 2022
 Pruvotina cryophila (Pelseneer, 1901)
 Pruvotina gauszi Salvini-Plawen, 1978
 Pruvotina glandulosa Pedrouzo, García-Álvarez & Urgorri, 2022
 Pruvotina harpagone Pedrouzo, García-Álvarez & Urgorri, 2022
 Pruvotina impexa (Pruvot, 1890)
 Pruvotina longispinosa Salvini-Plawen, 1978
 Pruvotina manifesta Zamarro, Garcia-Alvarez & Urgorri, 2013
 Pruvotina megathecata Salvini-Plawen, 1978
 Pruvotina pallioglandulata Salvini-Plawen, 1978
 Pruvotina peniculata Salvini-Plawen, 1978
 Pruvotina praegnans Salvini-Plawen, 1978
 Pruvotina providens Thiele, 1913
 Pruvotina uniperata Salvini-Plawen, 1978
 Pruvotina zamarroae Pedrouzo, García-Álvarez & Urgorri, 2022

References

 García-Álvarez O., Salvini-Plawen L.v., Urgorri V. & Troncoso J.S. (2014). Mollusca. Solenogastres, Caudofoveata, Monoplacophora. Fauna Iberica. 38: 1-294

External links
 Cockerell, T. D. A. (1903). Some homonymous generic names. The Nautilus. 16(10): 118
 Pruvot G. (1890). Sur quelques Néoméniées nouvelles de la Méditerranée. Archives de Zoologie Expérimentale et Générale (2)8: notes, xxi-xxiv

Pruvotinidae